Wallace Davis was a former professional American football player who played in the National Football League. He played for the Atlanta Falcons In college, he played for the Lincoln University. After retiring from the NFL, he was the head football coach at Carver High School in Columbus, Georgia, where he also coached track and field. He was one of around 4500 players who successfully sued the NFL for concussion-related injuries in the case Anderson v. NFL.

References

Atlanta Falcons players
Lincoln University (Missouri) alumni
George Washington Carver High School (Columbus, Georgia) alumni